The Battle of Ghanaur was fought between Baghel Singh's Sikh forces and Shah Alam II's Mughal forces.

Battle 
According to Sikh Sources, the Mughal Emperor Shah Alam II send a force of 100,000 to chastise the Sikhs. The force was commanded by Majad-Ud-Daula. Baghel Singh was known to be a great strategist and statesman. The Sikhs out-maneuvered the entire army at Ghanaur, Patiala. The Mughal forces eventually surrendered to the Sikhs.

References

See also 

 Nihang
 Martyrdom and Sikhism

Battles involving the Sikhs